Dante Alighieri was the first dreadnought battleship built for the Regia Marina (Royal Italian Navy) and was completed in 1913. The ship served as a flagship during World War I, but saw very little action other than the Second Battle of Durazzo in 1918 during which she did not engage enemy forces. She never fired her guns in anger during her career. Dante Alighieri was refitted in 1923, stricken from the Navy List five years later and subsequently sold for scrap.

Description

Dante Alighieri was designed by Rear Admiral Engineer Edoardo Masdea, Chief Constructor of the Regia Marina, based on the ideas of General Vittorio Cuniberti who advocated a battleship with main guns of a single caliber and optimized for broadside fire. In addition, the ship's superstructure and funnels were to be kept to a minimum.

Dante Alighieri had two rudders, one behind the other, and a crew of 31 officers and 950 enlisted men.

The ship was propelled by four propeller shafts driven by Parsons steam turbines. Steam for the turbines was provided by 23 Blechynden water-tube boilers, seven of which burned oil and the remaining sixteen burned a mixture of oil and coal. The boilers were widely separated in two compartments, each with two funnels, and the turbines were positioned between the two center turrets.

The main turrets were protected by a maximum of 254 millimeters of armor while the secondary turrets and the casemates had  of armor. The conning tower had walls 305 millimeters thick.

Armament
Dante Alighieris main armament consisted of a dozen 46-caliber 305-millimeter (12 inch) guns, in four triple-gun turrets positioned on the ship's centerline. None of the turrets were  superfiring. While the later classes of battleships and battlecruisers designed for the Imperial Russian Navy shared the turret layout of the Dante Alighieri, all surviving evidence shows that the Russians decided on this layout for their own reasons.

The ship's secondary armament consisted of twenty 50-caliber  guns. Eight of these guns were fitted in twin-gun turrets abreast the forward and aft main gun turrets while the remaining 12 guns were mounted in casemates on the sides of the hull. These guns could depress to −10 degrees and had a maximum elevation of +15 degrees; they had a rate of fire of six shots per minute. For defense against torpedo boats, Dante Alighieri carried thirteen 50-caliber  guns mounted on the turret tops. These guns had the same range of elevation as the secondary guns, although their rate of fire was higher at 10 rounds per minute. The ship was also fitted with three submerged  torpedo tubes, one on each broadside and the third in the stern.

Construction and service

Dante Alighieri, named after the medieval Italian poet, was the only battleship ever named for a poet. She was laid down at the naval shipyard in Castellammare di Stabia on 6 June 1909, launched on 20 August 1910, and completed on 15 January 1913. The ship was used to evaluate Curtiss floatplanes in 1913–14. When Italy entered World War I in May 1915, Dante Alighieri was the flagship of the 1st Battle Squadron based at Taranto and remained with the squadron through 1916. For the rest of the war, the ship was assigned to the Southern Adriatic and Ionian Sea forces. Under the command of Vice Admiral Paolo Thaon di Revel, the ship was positioned to intercept any Austro-Hungarian ships based at Cattaro if they sortied to attack the Allied ships bombarding Durazzo on 2 October 1918. The Austro-Hungarians remained in harbor and Dante Alighieri did not fire her guns during the battle.

King Victor Emmanuel III entertained delegates to the Genoa Conference aboard Dante Alighieri in 1922. The ship was refitted in 1923 with a tripod foremast and an aircraft flying-off platform on Turret No. 3, and her forward funnels were made taller to reduce smoke interference with the bridge. That same year, the ship transported Benito Mussolini to Palermo, Sicily. The Italian economy had been weakened by fighting in World War I, and by the late 1920s it could no longer afford to maintain a sizable fleet. As a result, Admiral Giovanni Sechi decided to scrap Dante Alighieri and the salvaged battleship  to reduce the naval budget. The ship was stricken on 1 July 1928 and was subsequently scrapped.

Notes

Footnotes

References

External links

 Page from Warships on the web
 Page in Russian Language
 Dante Alighieri Marina Militare website

Battleships of the Regia Marina
World War I battleships of Italy
1910 ships
Ships built in Castellammare di Stabia
Dante Alighieri